The 80th Infantry Division (80-ya Pekhotnaya Diviziya) was an infantry formation of the Russian Imperial Army.

Organization
1st Brigade
317th Infantry Regiment
318th Infantry Regiment
2nd Brigade
319th Infantry Regiment
320th Infantry Regiment
80th Artillery Brigade

References

Infantry divisions of the Russian Empire
Military units and formations disestablished in 1918